Bohemia is an album by Leo Sidran.  It was released on June 1, 2004 on Liquid 8.

Track listing
 Jamboree  
 La Misma Luna    
 Deaf Ears  
 Tobacco Alinado  
 Not A Word  
 Born Again Today    
 Stolen Moments  
 Bombacha  
 Living On The Interest  
 De Hora En Hora   
 Walking On Sunshine

2004 albums
Leo Sidran albums